List of works by or about Richard Powers, American novelist.

Novels
 1985 Three Farmers on Their Way to a Dance, HarperCollins 
 1988 Prisoner's Dilemma, McGraw Hill 
 1991 The Gold Bug Variations, HarperCollins 
 1993 Operation Wandering Soul, HarperCollins 
 1995 Galatea 2.2, Farrar Straus & Giroux 
 1998 Gain, Farrar Straus & Giroux 
 2000 Plowing the Dark, Farrar, Straus & Giroux 
 2003 The Time of Our Singing, Farrar, Straus & Giroux 
 2006 The Echo Maker, Farrar, Straus & Giroux 
 2009 Generosity: An Enhancement, Farrar, Straus & Giroux 
 2014 Orfeo, W. W. Norton & Company 
 2018 The Overstory, W. W. Norton & Company 
 2021 Bewilderment, W. W. Norton & Company

Short fiction

Essays
 
 
 
 
 
 
 
 
 
 
 
 
 
 

Bibliographies by writer
Bibliographies of American writers